"Brochan Lom" is a Scottish Gaelic nonsense song about  porridge. The tune is popular and appears frequently at Scottish country dances and ceilidhs.  It falls into the category of "mouth music" (Puirt a beul), used to create music for dancing in the absence of instruments. It is a strathspey song and is commonly sung or played for the Highland Schottische (a popular ceilidh dance), and for the Highland Fling.

As an instrumental tune, Brochan Lom is also known as The Orange And Blue, Katy Jones’, Kitty Jones, Kitty Jones’, The Orange & Blue Highland, Orange And Blue, The Orange And Blue Highland Fling.

Lyrics 
The words vary in different traditions but a common variant is:

"This above was a jocular song that arose about some ill-made porridge, which being very thin was declared to be like gruel, or even 'sowans' (the fermented juice of oatmeal husks boiled, in bygone times a favourite article of food in Scotland."

Use in movies 
 It appears as a drinking song in Whisky Galore! 
 It is a background music theme in The Bridal Path.
In Pasolini's film The Canterbury Tales, Nicholas in the Miller's Tale spies John the Carpenter (Michael Balfour) singing this tune while leaving for Osney and runs next door to make advances on his wife Alison. The recording used in the film is of Jimmy MacBeath.

Recordings
 The Highland Council website "Am Baile: Highland history and culture" has two versions: 
 a version with voice and piano from the CD Cluich Còmhla – Òrain is Ranna where the words are very clearly pronounced.
 a version sung by Christina Stewart with instrumental accompaniment, from the album Bairn's Kist (2011).
 The website of Learning and Teaching Scotland has a version on violin. 
 Calum Kennedy recorded this on the album "Songs in Gaelic" (2008)
 Robin Hall & Jimmie Macgregor with The Galliards recorded this on the album Scottish Choice (1960)
 Oran recorded a version on their album "Kith & Kin".
 The Glasgow Gaelic Musical Association recorded a choral version on the album "Orain Is Puirt-a-Beul" (1993).
The Session lists 16 instrumental recordings of the tune.

External links
Brochan Lom, Learning and Teaching Scotland. Includes a recording, a list of the  musical concepts exemplified by the tune, and a score with the concepts as annotations
Brochan Lom, Traditional, Scots Independent. Includes phonetic pronunciation of the Gaelic words.
Sheet Music - Brochan Lom, Mama Lisa's World: International Music & Culture
Lyric Request: Brochan Lom Tana Lom / Hot Porridge Cold, and Lyrics Add: Brochan Lom, discussions on the Mudcat Cafe Forum regarding the meaning and pronunciation of the words

Notes 

Scottish folk songs
Scottish Gaelic music
Year of song unknown
Songwriter unknown